The 2016–17 Gabon Championnat National D1 is the 49th season in top-flight football in Gabon. Mounana are the defending champions having won their second title.

Participating teams

The league consists of 14 teams, including Adouma and Lozo, who were promoted from D2 for the 2016-17 season.

Stadia and locations

League table

Positions by round

References

Gabon Championnat National D1 seasons
Championnat National D1
Championnat National D1
Gabon